

Kurt Pflieger (19 September 1890 – 19 September 1958) was a general in the Wehrmacht of Nazi Germany during World War II who commanded several divisions. He was a recipient of the Knight's Cross of the Iron Cross.

Awards and decorations

 Knight's Cross of the Iron Cross on 10 February 1945 as generalleutnant and commander of 416th Infantry Division

References

Citations

Bibliography

 

1890 births
1958 deaths
Lieutenant generals of the German Army (Wehrmacht)
German Army personnel of World War I
Recipients of the clasp to the Iron Cross, 1st class
Recipients of the Gold German Cross
Recipients of the Knight's Cross of the Iron Cross
German prisoners of war in World War II held by the United Kingdom
People from Hesse-Nassau
Military personnel from Wiesbaden
German Army generals of World War II